Çığrı is a village in the Başmakçı District, Afyonkarahisar Province, Turkey. Its population is 614 (2021).
It is located southwest of Ovacık and southeast of Yassıören.

References

Villages in Başmakçı District